The Happy People is a live album by the Cannonball Adderley Quintet, a band led by jazz saxophonist Julian "Cannonball" Adderley. It was recorded in 1970 in New York City and released in 1972 through Capitol Records. It features contributions from the quintet: Cannonball Adderley on saxophone, George Duke on piano, Walter Booker on string bass, Roy McCurdy on drums and Nat Adderley on cornet, with guest appearances from Airto Moreira, Olga James, Flora Purim, David T. Walker, Chuck Rainey, King Errisson and Mayuto Correa.

Track listing

Personnel
The Cannonball Adderley Quintet
Julian "Cannonball" Adderley – alto saxophone, producer
George Duke – piano, electric piano, arrangement (track 2)
Walter Booker – double bass
Roy McCurdy – drums
Nathaniel Carlyle Adderley – cornet
Additional musicians

Airto Moreira – lead vocals (tracks: 1, 4), percussion
Olga James – lead vocals (track 3)
Flora Purim – vocals
David T. Walker – guitar (track 3)
Chuck Rainey – electric bass (track 3)
"King" Errisson Pallman Johnson – percussion
Mayuto Correa – percussion (tracks 1, 2, 4)
David Axelrod – arrangement (tracks: 1, 3), producer
Nathaniel E. Adderley, Jr. – arrangement (track 4)

Technical
John Hoernle – art direction
George Bartell – illustration
Leroy Brooks – photography

References

External links

The Happy People on Cannonball Adderley's website

1970 live albums
Capitol Records live albums
Cannonball Adderley live albums
Albums produced by Cannonball Adderley
Albums produced by David Axelrod (musician)
Nat Adderley live albums
George Duke albums